Ananda Prakash Sen (born 20 September 1923, date of death unknown), often known as A. P. Sen, was an Indian judge who served as a Justice of the Supreme Court of India.

Career
Sen came from a lawyers' family of Madhya Pradesh. He passed from Science College and Law College, Nagpur and started practice in the District Court in 1945. With the creation of the Madhya Pradesh High Court, he shifted to Jabalpur in 1956 and practised continuous 21 years on constitutional, civil and taxation matters. He became the Advocate General of Madhya Pradesh in June 1966. On 7 November 1967 he was elevated as Additional Judge of the Madhya Pradesh High Court and became the permanent Judge in July 1968. During the period of the Emergency he was transferred to the Rajasthan High Court as Acting Chief Justice. In 1978 he also served as Chief Justice of Madhya Pradesh High Court. Justice Sen became the Judge of the Supreme Court of India on 17 July 1978 and retired in September 1988 from his judgeship. Justice Sen refused a farewell function at the time of his retirement, becoming the first Indian justice in the history of the Supreme Court to do so. Sen is deceased.

References

1923 births
Year of death missing
20th-century Indian judges
20th-century Indian lawyers
21st-century Indian lawyers
21st-century Indian judges
Chief Justices of the Madhya Pradesh High Court
Judges of the Rajasthan High Court
Justices of the Supreme Court of India